Abraham Jacob van Imbyze van Batenburg (1753 in Breda, Netherlands – 9 October 1806 in Barbados) was a Dutch governor of Berbice and Essequibo (Guyana) during the period 1789-1806.

His life
Abraham Jacob was baptized on 17 June 1753 in the Walloon Church ("Waals Gereformeerd") in Breda, as the son of Johan Bernhard Imbyze van Batenburg (bef. 1723-1768) and Susanna de Wit (1723-).

His father Johan Bernhard Imbyze van Batenburg was a draughtsman of maps, military-engineer (1743) and captain (1760). His grandfather was probably Paschasius Diederick van Batenburgh.

He was married 1782 in Tilburg, Netherlands with Wilhelmina Suzanna Zurmegedé. She was born on 21 April 1759 in Veere, (Netherlands), possibly as daughter of Hendrik Cornelis Zurmegede, free citizen of Batavia, Dutch East Indies, and Susanna Lints.

In Berbice (Guyana) they had nine children: Suzanna Maria (1784-?), Hendrik Christiaan (1786-?), Adriana Baldwina (1788-?), Jan Jacob Hendrik (1788-?), Lambert Abraham (1791 in Java (Dutch East-Indies - 1829), Catharina Cordelia (1793-?), Elizabeth (1796-1864), Henriette Maria (1797-?) and Hendrika Maria (1801-?).

Alternative names are: van Imbijze van Batenburg and Imbyse van Batenburg,

Jobs
Initially active until 1791 for the Dutch East India Company, he was from 1796 on in service for the British government and the Batavian Republic (1795-1806). Imbyze van Batenburg was governor of:
 Berbice (Guyana) (between 1789 and 27 March 1802)
 Essequibo (Guyana) (between 22 April 1796 and 27 March 1802)
 Berbice (between June 1804 and 1806).

Sources
 http://www.vanbatenborgh.nl/documents/downloads/familie%20overzicht%20Van%20Imbyze%20van%20Batenburg.pdf

1753 births
1806 deaths
18th-century Dutch colonial governors
People from Breda
Governors of Berbice
Governors of Essequibo